Graeme Henderson (born 1947) is an Australian maritime historian, and author.

He has researched and written about the maritime history of Australia and Western Australia for over forty years.

He has been involved in underwater archaeology.  He has been involved in investigating wrecks in Fremantle Harbour, as well as on the Western Australian coast.

Publications

References 

1947 births
Maritime historians
Maritime history of Australia
Living people